Erich Brenter (born February 23, 1941) is an Austrian who was noted for his skill at skibobbing. He reportedly held that record for 30 years. He is married to a Norwegian named Ranheid and is CEO of Brenter Snowbike.

References

Austrian sportsmen
1941 births
Living people